David Pickles (16 November 1935 – 22 June 2020) was an English first-class cricketer, who played in 41 matches for Yorkshire from 1957 to 1960. He also played for the Yorkshire Second XI during this time.

A right-arm fast bowler, Pickles took 96 wickets at 21.47, with best match figures of 7 for 61 and 5 for 72 against Somerset at Taunton in 1957. He took 5 for 42 in a Roses Match against Lancashire in 1958.

He and his wife Jill had three children. He died at home in Yorkshire on 22 June 2020, aged 84.

References

1935 births
2020 deaths
Yorkshire cricketers
Cricketers from Halifax, West Yorkshire
English cricketers